Tidal Arms is an experimental/psychedelic/rock band from Brooklyn, New York that formed in 2009. They self-released their first album, The Sun Exploding, on February 13, 2011, and followed up with a national tour supporting Glassjaw. The band's self-titled second album was released on November 26, 2013 via Black Numbers.

Formation
Following the break-up of his bands From Autumn To Ashes and Biology, vocalist/drummer Francis Mark went on to form Warship. In 2009, after the departure of Warship's co-founding members, Mark met guitarist Tom Tierney on Craig's List and hired him to perform with the band on a national tour supporting Goblin Cock. Mark and Tierney continued playing together after the tour, splitting time writing between Philadelphia and Brooklyn. Shortly thereafter, ex-Kiss Kiss bassist Patrick Southern was brought into the rehearsals and writing sessions for what would become Tidal Arms.

Band Name Origin
When two galaxies pass by each other in close proximity, their shapes distort due to each other's gravity. The outside spiral arms splay out into space, often casting stars and dust into the abyss as their host galaxies drift slowly back towards each other in orbit. These spiral distortions are called tidal arms, or more commonly, tidal tails.

Members
Francis Mark - drums
Tom Tierney - guitar, vocals
Patrick Southern - bass

Discography
Hair and Teeth/Flooded Meadows 7" (2010)
The Sun Exploding (2011)
Tidal Arms (album) (2013)

References

External links
Official Site
Tidal Arms on Facebook.com
Tidal Arms on Bandcamp.com

American experimental musical groups
Psychedelic rock music groups from New York (state)